Imber tropicus is a moth of the family Sphingidae and only member of the genus Imber. It was described by Maxwell Sydney Moulds in 1983. It is found in the tropical north of Australia, including the Northern Territory, Queensland and Western Australia.

The wingspan is about 80 mm. Adults are greyish brown, and have a recurved inner margin to the forewings, and a recurved margin to the tornus of the hindwings.

The larvae probably feed on Rosaceae species.

References

Smerinthini
Moths described in 1983